Nagarathar Kavadi is a special pilgrimage of its type, where Nagarathar people will hold kavadi on their shoulders and walk to see darshan of Lord Murugan in Pazhani. People across 76 towns in the Chettinad area (Sivaganga/Pudukottai district) will participate on the occasion of Thaipoosam. There are two different groups of Nagarathar kavadi that would travel towards Pazhani and be joined a few kilometres before Pazhani. They are named Melavattagai Kavadi and Keelvattagai Kavadi.

Starting place
People from across Chettinad towns in Sivaganga and Pudukottai district start from their respective towns and reach Kundrakudi on the 8th day night before Thaipoosam. Once the kavadi from across the towns are gathered in Kundrakudi, next morning all the kavadi will start with Vel leading all the kavadis and pachai kavadi at the end.

Basic rules 
In early days the information is unclear. Based on the written pattayam, a person should bathe before lifting and placing the kavadi on his shoulder. Once he started walking with kavadi on his shoulder he should not drink water or urinate. If he needs to do that, he needs to bathe again before having the kavadi placed on his shoulder. The person carrying the kavadi should wear a white dhoti, and he should stay in the same dhoti until the kavadi is offered to Lord Murugan in Pazhani.

Guides 
Throughout the yathra, all the kavadi will be guided by Aranmanai Pongal Ayya and Samiyadi Ayya. This history dates back to past years, where Aranmanai Pongal Ayya will prepare and serve food for all persons walking with kavadi and later will do all poojas to kavadi. Melavattagai Kavadi will be guided by Nerkuppai Ayya.

Kavadi Pooja 
Throughout the journey, until the kavadis are offered to Lord Murugan in Pazhani, pooja will be done to kavadi. It is believed that Lord Murugan/Pazhani Andavan is in each and every kavadi. The pooja happens in these places after starting from Kundrakudi.
 First day night - Maruthipatti
 Second day night - Samudrapatti
 Third day night - Idaichi Madam
 Fourth day night - Semmadapatti
 Fifth day night - Kalingappayya OOrani
 Sixth day - First pooja in Annadhana Madam
 Seventh day - Second Pooja in Annadhana Madam and Thaipoosam
 Eighth day - Third Pooja in Annadhana Madam
 Ninth day - Fourth day Pooja in Annadhana Madam and kavadi offering to Lord Murugan in the Hill Temple, Pazhani
 Tenth day - Fifth day pooja in Annadhana Madam
 Eleventh day - Sixth day aduppadi pooja in Annadhana Madam
 Twelfth day - Sandhana Abhishekam and kavadi will start returning to native home town.

References

External links
Nagarathar Kavadi
Lectoro.com: Nagarathar Kavadi
Palani.Nagarathar.com
Nagarathar.Gateway.com

Hindu pilgrimages
Hinduism in Tamil Nadu